Adrian Robert Krainer is a Uruguayan-American biochemist and molecular geneticist known for his research into RNA gene-splicing. Krainer holds the St. Giles Foundation Professorship at Cold Spring Harbor Laboratory in Laurel Hollow, New York.

Early life and education 
Krainer was born in Montevideo, Uruguay to a Jewish family of Hungarian and Romanian descent. He has one older brother, who is a chemical engineer. His father did forced labor for two years in a Romanian labor camp (Ferma Alba) during World War II. After the war, his father's original surname, Kreiner changed to Krainer due to a clerical error when he was a refugee in Italy. His parents owned a small leather business in Montevideo. Krainer attended a private bilingual French-Spanish elementary school. He later attended a public school for two years before completing his pre-college education with four years at a private Spanish-Hebrew school. Krainer lived through political unrest during his teenage years, including urban guerrilla and military dictatorship. Krainer received a full scholarship from Columbia University and completed a Bachelor of Arts degree in Biochemistry in 1981. He graduated cum laude and Phi Beta Kappa. In 1986, he earned a Doctor of Philosophy degree in biochemistry from Harvard University.

Career and research
From 1986 to 1989, Krainer conducted postdoctoral research as the first Cold Spring Harbor Fellow at the Cold Spring Harbor Laboratory. Krainer worked as an assistant professor from 1989 to 1990, Associate Professor from 1990 to 1994, and Professor since 1994. Krainer is a faculty member of the graduate programs in Genetics, Molecular and Cellular Biology, and Molecular Genetics and Microbiology at State University of New York, Stony Brook. Krainer holds the St. Giles Foundation Professorship at Cold Spring Harbor Laboratory. His former students include Ewan Birney. Krainer is a co-founder and Director of Stoke Therapeutics, based in Bedford, MA.

Awards and honors
In 2021 Krainer received the Wolf Prize in Medicine. In 2019 he was awarded a Breakthrough Prize in Life Sciences for his contributions to the understanding of the RNA gene-splicing process and, in collaboration with fellow Prize Laureate Dr. Frank Bennet of Ionis Pharmaceuticals, the development of medical interventions that target the RNA-splicing process, including Spinraza, which is the first treatment for the genetic disorder Spinal Muscular Atrophy. Other honors include:
 Pew Scholar in the Biomedical Sciences (1992–96); 
 National Institute of General Medical Sciences MERIT Award (2012-2022);
 New York Intellectual Property Law Association Inventor of the Year Award (2017); 
 FE Bennett Award of the American Neurological Association (2017); 
 RNA Society Lifetime Achievement Award (2019); 
 Ross Prize in Molecular Medicine (2020); 
 Gregor Johann Mendel Medal for Outstanding Achievements in Science (2020), Brno, Czech Republic; 
 Fellow of the American Academy of Arts & Sciences (2016); 
 Fellow of the National Academy of Inventors (2018); 
 Member of the National Academy of Medicine (2019); 
 Member of the National Academy of Sciences (2020)

Personal life 
Krainer's father and maternal grandparents were Holocaust refugees. He has three children, Emily, Andrew, and Brian. His wife, Kate Krainer, is a plant geneticist.

References 

Living people
1958 births
Columbia College (New York) alumni
Harvard University alumni
Stony Brook University faculty
Uruguayan Jews
Uruguayan emigrants to the United States
Uruguayan people of Romanian-Jewish descent
Uruguayan people of Hungarian-Jewish descent
Uruguayan neuroscientists
20th-century Uruguayan educators
21st-century Uruguayan educators
American people of Uruguayan-Jewish descent
Members of the United States National Academy of Sciences
Members of the National Academy of Medicine
Fellows of the National Academy of Inventors
Fellows of the American Academy of Arts and Sciences